St Neots was a rural district in Huntingdonshire, England from 1894 to 1974, around the northern and eastern sides of the urban area of St Neots.

The district had its origins in the St Neots Rural Sanitary District. This had been created under the Public Health Acts of 1872 and 1875, giving public health and local government responsibilities for rural areas to the existing Boards of Guardians of Poor Law Unions.

Under the Local Government Act 1894, Rural Sanitary Districts became Rural Districts from 28 December 1894, and rural sanitary districts which straddled county boundaries were to be split so that separate rural districts were created for the parts in each county. Generally, the Huntingdonshire part of the St Neots Rural Sanitary District became the St Neots Rural District, whilst the Bedfordshire part became the Eaton Socon Rural District. As an exception to this rule, the Bedfordshire and Huntingdonshire County Councils agreed that the parish of Swineshead, despite being in Huntingdonshire, would be included in the Eaton Socon Rural District as it was surrounded by Bedfordshire parishes. Similarly, the parish of Tilbrook in Bedfordshire was included in the St Neots Rural District as it formed a long salient sticking out from Bedfordshire into territory almost surrounded by Huntingdonshire. The county boundary was changed two years later to match the boundary which had been agreed for the Rural Districts, with Swineshead becoming part of Bedfordshire and Tilbrook part of Huntingdonshire on 30 September 1896.

St Neots Rural District was expanded in 1935 by taking in Covington parish from the disbanded Thrapston Rural District.

In 1965 Huntingdonshire and the Soke of Peterborough merged to form Huntingdon and Peterborough.

In 1974 the district was abolished under the Local Government Act 1972 and became part of the non-metropolitan district of Huntingdon, subsequently renamed Huntingdonshire. A small area was transferred to Bedfordshire.

Parishes

References

Districts of England abolished by the Local Government Act 1972
Districts of England created by the Local Government Act 1894
Rural districts of England
History of Huntingdonshire
Local government in Bedfordshire